Five ships of the Royal Navy have borne the name Concord, or the French variant, HMS Concorde:

  was a 24-gun ship captured from the Dutch in 1649.  She was hulked in 1653 and was sold in 1659.
  was a sloop captured from the French in 1697 and removed from service before 1699.
  was a  light cruiser launched in 1916 and scrapped in 1935.
  was a  destroyer, launched in 1945 as HMS Corso, but renamed in 1946. She was broken up in 1962.

See also

 

Royal Navy ship names